Ghetto Fabulous is the third studio album by the New Orleans-based rapper Mystikal. It was released on December 15, 1998, by No Limit Records. It was produced by Beats By the Pound. Like his previous album, this also proved to be a success peaking at #5 on the Billboard 200 and #1 on the Top R&B/Hip-Hop Albums selling 386,000 copies in its first week. A single, "That's the Nigga", reached #25 on the Hot R&B/Hip-Hop Singles & Tracks. This was Mystikal's final album with No Limit Records. The album was also certified platinum by the RIAA on January 27, 1999. On January 29, 2000, Ghetto Fabulous had sold 2,901,131 records in the U.S.

Track listing

Personnel
Craig B.:  producer  
Beats by the Pound: engineer, mixing  
Busta Rhymes: featured artist, guest artist, performer, primary artist  
C-Murder: featured artist, guest artist, performer, primary artist  
Tony Dawsey: mastering  
Daz: producer  
Fiend: composer, featured artist, guest artist, performer, primary artist  
Guillotine: composer, featured artist, guest artist, primary artist  
M.A.C.: featured artist, primary artist  
Master P: composer, featured artist, guest artist, performer, primary artist   
Mia X: composer, featured artist, guest artist, performer, primary artist  
Mo B. Dick: producer  
M. Morales: composer  
Mystikal: composer, primary artist  
Naughty by Nature: composer, featured artist, guest artist, performer, primary artist  
O'Dell: producer, backing vocals  
Dave Robinson: composer  
Silkk the Shocker: composer, featured artist, guest artist, performer, primary artist  
Snoop Dogg: composer, featured artist, guest artist, performer, primary artist  
Carlos Stevens: producer  
Anita Thomas: backing vocals  
K. Walker: composer  
M. Williams: composer  
Charlie Wilson: composer

Charts

Weekly charts

Year-end charts

Certifications

See also
 List of number-one R&B albums of 1999 (U.S.)

References

1998 albums
Jive Records albums
No Limit Records albums
Mystikal albums
Gangsta rap albums by American artists